Three polls make up the 2018 NCAA Division I women's soccer rankings, the United Soccer Coaches Poll, the Soccer America Poll, and the Top Drawer Soccer Poll. They represent the ranking system for the 2018 NCAA Division I women's soccer season.

Legend

United Soccer Coaches

Soccer America

Top Drawer Soccer
Source:

References

Rankings
College women's soccer rankings in the United States